Boughton Lees is a village in the civil parish of Boughton Aluph, Ashford District, Kent, England. It stands on the main Ashford-Faversham road, some 3.5 miles (5.6 km) north of Ashford.

The village church is Saint Christopher's Church, while the nearby All Saints’ Church, Boughton Aluph is the venue for the Stour Music Festival. Cricket has been played on the village green, The Lees, for over 200 years.

The Eastwell Manor, a country-house hotel, is situated on the edge of the village in Eastwell Park.

References

External links

 Neighbourhood Plan for the Parish of Boughton Aluph and Eastwell

Villages in Kent
Villages in the Borough of Ashford